Naked Alibi is a 1954 American film noir crime film directed by Jerry Hopper and starring Sterling Hayden, Gloria Grahame and Gene Barry. It was released on October 1, 1954 by Universal-International. Portions of the film were shot in Tijuana.

Plot

In a California city, Lt. Fred Parks interrogates drunken local baker Albert Willis about his possible connection to recent eastside robberies. After repeatedly stating that he is innocent, Willis erupts in anger and punches Parks, who retaliates. Chief Joseph E. Conroy enters just in time to hear Willis threaten revenge but is compelled to release him because he has read that councilman Edgar Goodwin is calling for an investigation of police brutality. Willis returns to his wife Helen but slips out again that night and hours later, Parks is shot.

Joe takes on the case and immediately suspects Willis; however, he has only the fatal bullets as evidence. When the police try to arrest Willis again, he runs away, falling on his head during the chase. He once again swears he is innocent, and after his lawyer, wife, and Goodwin hear about Willis's injuries, pressure is put on Joe to let Willis go. That evening two more officers are killed and Joe goes to arrest Willis himself. When Willis provokes another fight, the altercation is witnessed by a reporter, and Joe is soon fired for brutality. Undaunted, he asks his friend, private detective Matt Matthews, to help tail Willis.

Over the next few days, Willis grows disturbed by the shadows following him and tells Helen that he must leave town to clear his head. He heads to Border City with Joe following close behind. There Willis meets his girlfriend Marianna who sings at a bar. Marianna knows nothing of Willis's other life and accepts his rough treatment. That night, Joe shows Willis's photo around town and is duped by a street hustler who, with two of his friends, stabs, robs, and leaves Joe for dead.

A young local boy named Petey finds Joe in the alley the next morning and, along with his uncle Charlie, minister to him in their apartment. When Marianna, who lives upstairs from Petey, comes by to help them, she pockets Joe's photo of Willis, which is captioned: "Killer or family man?" Later at a party hosted by Willis, she asks him to marry her, but he refuses. Marianna is then horrified to witness Willis throwing waiter over an indoor balcony. She heads for home, followed by Willis, and while Joe watches from the window, Willis grabs her roughly and threatens her. Marianna runs inside where she attempts to extract information about Willis from Joe by flirting with him.

The next morning, Joe readies to go, stopping only to say goodbye to Marianna who quietly talks to him about the big mistakes she has made. Meanwhile, Willis has come to believe Marianna has a lover and jealously storms into her dressing room. When she admits she knows he is married, Willis realizes that she has spoken to Joe and beats her. She runs to Joe's hotel room to warn him and, after seeing her bruises, Joe explains that he must prove Willis guilty in order to clear his own reputation. He shows her a telegram that reveals Willis's participation in a hijacking ring in the States. When Joe and Marianna step outside to deliver the telegram to the police, Willis and his goons ambush them and take them to the bar.

Willis plans with his goons to create a ruckus and kill them incidentally. Meanwhile, Joe learns from Marianna that Willis never attends church and deduces that Willis must have entered church only to hide the gun. Just then, the goons start a fight and the bar erupts in confusion, allowing Joe and Marianna to race out the back door. Willis follows them and, in the back alley, Joe knocks him out and drags him into his car. The goons see the car leaving and report the "kidnapping" to the police.

Joe and Marianna abandon the car and force Willis into the back of a truck. As soon as they arrive in their home town Willis escapes. Knowing he will run to the church, Joe and Marianna follow him but police arrest Joe. Marianna goes to the church where Willis has retrieved his gun and subsequently takes Marianna hostage. When Joe then bursts in with the policemen, Willis drags Marianna onto the rooftop. A chase ensues, during which Willis shoots Marianna and is himself shot by the police and falls to the ground. Joe carries Marianna to the waiting ambulance and then walks away alone into the dark city.

Cast
 Sterling Hayden as Chief Joe Conroy
 Gloria Grahame as Marianna
 Gene Barry as Al Willis
 Marcia Henderson as Helen Willis
 Max Showalter as Det. Lt. Fred Parks (as Casey Adams) 
 Billy Chapin as Petey
 Chuck Connors as Capt. Owen Kincaide
 Don Haggerty as Matt Matthews
 Stuart Randall as Chief A.S. Babcock
 Don Garrett as Tony 
 Richard Beach as Felix
 Tol Avery as Irish 
 Paul Levitt as Gerald Frazier
 Fay Roope as Commissioner F.J. O'Day
 Joseph Mell as Otto Stoltz
 Alan DeWitt (uncredited) as Motel proprietor

Home-media release
On November 5, 2019, Naked Alibi was released on both DVD and Blu-ray formats for the first time by Kino International under its Kino Lorber Studio Classics line with licensing by Universal Pictures. Both formats present the film in its theatrical aspect ratio of 1.85:1 (the film was originally shot in the academy ratio at 1.37:1).

References

External links
 
 
 
 
Naked Alibi at Letterboxd
 

1954 films
1954 crime drama films
American crime thriller films
American black-and-white films
Film noir
Films directed by Jerry Hopper
Films produced by Ross Hunter
Universal Pictures films
American crime drama films
American police detective films
Films shot in Tijuana
1950s crime thriller films
1950s English-language films
1950s American films